Q104 can refer to:

Quran 104, the 104th chapter of the Islamic Holy book
Q104 (New York City bus)

Radio stations
 CFRQ-FM in Halifax, Nova Scotia
 CKQV-FM in Vermilion Bay, Ontario
 WQAL in Cleveland, Ohio
 WAXQ in New York City
 KBEQ in Kansas City, Missouri
 WCKQ in Campbellsville, Kentucky